The Medford Pear Blossom Festival is an annual spring parade and festival in Medford, Oregon. It is held in April to mark the time when pear trees that are a traditional part of the town's economy come into blossom. It was founded in 1954.

The event includes seasonal activities such as promotion of local agriculture, a running race, cycling events along the Rogue River and a pageant.

In 1967, Leonard Nimoy was invited to act as grand marshal and provided the parade with the only known appearance of Nimoy as Spock of Star Trek fame in public.

There was no festival in 2020 on grounds of COVID-19 pandemic.

References

External links

Pear Blossom Run

Festivals in Oregon
1954 establishments in Oregon
Spring festivals in the United States
Medford, Oregon
Festivals established in 1954
Flower festivals in the United States
Annual events in Oregon
Parades in the United States